N'Ko may refer to:
 N'Ko script
 N'Ko language
 NKo (Unicode block)